"Dopamine" is a song by German disco and house music producer and DJ Purple Disco Machine featuring Dutch singer-songwriter Eyelar, released on 27 August 2021 as a single from Purple Disco Machine's second studio album Exotica. The song has received over 75 million streams on Spotify.

Composition
"Dopamine" is a track with an "80s-disco style". It is written in the key of B minor, with a tempo of 118 beats per minute.

Music video
The music video was released on 10 September 2021 and directed by James Fitzgerald. It showcases Purple Disco Machine as an eccentric scientist who "calls on his sleekly moustached 80s Californian sidekick to rescue Eyelar from 2021 with his time travelling Chevy Camaro". Video was filmed in Montenegro.

Credits and personnel
Credits adapted from AllMusic.

 Edvard Førre Erfjord – composer
 Eyelar – primary artist, vocals, composer
 Matt Johnson – keyboards, synthesizer
 Monte – computer music preparation, computer vocals, mixing, voices
 Alexander Pavelich – composer, vocals (background)
 Purple Disco Machine – primary artist, producer, recording arranger, bass, keyboards, synthesizer, composer
 John Summit – remix engineer
 Chi Thanh – guitar
 Jenson Vaughan – composer
 Drew Michael – drums

Charts

Weekly charts

Year-end charts

Certifications

References

2021 singles
2021 songs
Purple Disco Machine songs
Positiva Records singles